Florian Brügmann (born 23 January 1991) is a German footballer who plays as a right-back for Chemie Leipzig.

Career
Having come through the youth ranks of Hansa Rostock and Hamburger SV, Brügmann played for VfL Bochum.

From 2013 till summer 2017 he was contracted to Hallescher FC, making 111 appearances with 2 goals.

In August 2017, out-of-contract Brügmann joined FC Carl Zeiss Jena on a two-year contract. He left the club at the end of the 2018–19 season.

On 29 July 2019, he signed for MSV Duisburg. His contract was terminated on 3 January 2020 and he signed with Energie Cottbus.

Career statistics

References

External links

1991 births
Living people
Footballers from Hamburg
Association football defenders
German footballers
Germany youth international footballers
Hamburger SV II players
VfL Bochum players
VfL Bochum II players
Hallescher FC players
FC Carl Zeiss Jena players
MSV Duisburg players
FC Energie Cottbus players
BSG Chemie Leipzig (1997) players
2. Bundesliga players
3. Liga players
Regionalliga players
21st-century German people